Rowena Jane Roberts (born 14 May 1977, Kingston, Surrey, Great Britain) is a retired British artistic gymnast.

Career
Roberts began gymnastics at the age of four at the Elmbridge Leisure Centre and further trained at the Heathrow Gymnastics Club and Spelthorne School of Gymnastics later in her career.

Roberts made her international debut at the age of 12 in 1989 and travelled to the 1990 European Women's Artistic Gymnastics Championships as a team reserve after placing second in the Junior British Championships all-round, and taking the Junior British Beam title in the individual apparatus.

In 1991, Roberts took the Senior British Beam title and placed sixth in the all-round competition. Roberts represented Great Britain in the 1991 World Artistic Gymnastics Championships. In Indianapolis, USA.

In 1992 Roberts became all round British Gymnastics Champion and represented Great Britain at the 1992 European Women's Artistic Gymnastics Championships where she placed the highest British women’s gymnast in Europe, and ranked 19th. The highest placing ever by a British woman at that time.

Later that year she was one of two gymnasts selected to represent Team GB, Great Britain at the Olympic games. She was the youngest member of the Great Britain Olympic Team for the Barcelona Olympic Games.

Roberts remains the youngest ever British All Round Gymnastics champion and also the youngest female Gymnast to have represented Great Britain at the Olympic Games at the age of 15 years and 73 days. Roberts also holds the title of Master Gymnast from British Gymnastics.

Roberts appeared numerous times on TV during live broadcasts of various gymnastics championships. She also appeared on Blue Peter twice and in 1992 was the recipient of the Blue Peter Gold Badge.

Roberts retired from competitive Gymnastics at the age of 16 and started a commercial career in freight forwarding, logistics, technology and supply chain. She is currently Vice President Global Product Development at EV Cargo, one of the worlds fastest growing logistics businesses. 
 
She is also the founder and head coach of Gymnastics club ‘Gympickles’ based in SW London. Gympickles is a recreational club with an ethos focused on fun and inclusiveness for children of all abilities.

Personal life
Roberts married businessman, Clyde Buntrock on 12 May 2018 and changed her name to Rowena Buntrock.

References

Footnotes

Sources
Rowena Roberts at Sports Reference
Rowena Roberts - 1992 Olympics Team Compulsories - Floor Exercise
Sports Reference 
British WAG, 60 Year Of Olympic History Part Two.

1977 births
Living people
British female artistic gymnasts
Gymnasts at the 1992 Summer Olympics
Olympic gymnasts of Great Britain
People from Surrey